Sergei Konstantinovich Fyodorov (alternative English spelling Sergey Fedorov; born 1959 in Pskov, Russia) is a Russian icon painter.

Fyodorov studied in Moscow art school. He worked at Danilov monastery together with his father, Zenon (Зинон  or Теодор), the famous Russian icon painter.

For many years, he lived and worked in the UK and his major works in England include icons at Westminster Abbey, Winchester Cathedral also an icon for the shrine of Saint Richard at Chichester Cathedral and a fresco in Rochester Cathedral.

Other works include iconostasis of  Church of Christ's Ascension at Nikitskaya ("Smaller Ascension", Церковь "Малое Вознесение") and Russian Orthodox church  in Dzintari, Jurmala in Latvia.

Many of his works are in private chapels or private collections.

Notes

References

External links
 Fresco in Rochester
 Interview in The Independent
 The Independent Collector
 Russian Orthodox Church in Latvia

Russian artists
1959 births
Living people